Rear Admiral Mosoeu Magalefa (21 April 1949 - 27 May 2014) was a South African Navy officer, who served as Chief of Naval Staff. He retired from the Navy in 2009.

Military career
While at school he joined the Pan Africanist Congress (PAC) in 1963 and joined the Azanian People's Liberation Army (APLA) in 1967.

He went into exile in 1977 and completed Military training courses in Tanzania and Libya, the People's Republic of China, Sudan and Yugoslavia.

He returned to South Africa in the  1990s and integrated in the SANDF in 1996 and completed the Officers Orientation Course in 1997, the Naval Senior Staff Course in 1998. He served as Chief of Naval Staff Intelligence (1998-1999); Director Naval Personnel (1999-2001); Director Naval Review Co-ordination and Implementation (2002-2005); and Chief of Naval Staff from 2005 till his retirement.

References

South African admirals
1949 births
2014 deaths
People from Johannesburg